Kandemir is a surname. Notable people with the surname include:

Ahmet Kandemir (born 1970), Turkish basketball coach
Hüseyin Kandemir (born 1986), Turkish rower
Mahmut Kandemir, American engineer
Ömer Kandemir (born 1993), Turkish footballer
Tuğçe Kandemir (born 1996), Turkish singer-songwriter and literature teacher